Miloš Riečičiar (10 February 1990 in Čadca ) is a Slovak footballer who plays as a defender for ŠK LR Crystal Lednické Rovne, on loan from MFK Dubnica.

External links
MFK Dubnica profile 

1990 births
Living people
Slovak footballers
FK Dubnica players
Slovak Super Liga players
MŠK Novohrad Lučenec players
Association football defenders
People from Čadca
Sportspeople from the Žilina Region
MŠK Púchov players
PFK Piešťany players